Biculturalism in sociology describes the co-existence, to varying degrees, of two originally distinct cultures.

Official policy recognizing, fostering, or encouraging biculturalism typically emerges in countries that have emerged from a history of national or ethnic conflict in which neither side has gained complete victory. This condition usually arises from colonial settlement. Resulting conflicts may take place either between the colonisers and indigenous peoples (as in Fiji) and/or between rival groups of colonisers (as in, for example, South Africa). A deliberate policy of biculturalism influences the structures and decisions of governments to ensure that they allocate political and economic power and influence equitably between people and/or groups identified with each side of the cultural divide. 

Examples include the conflicts between Anglophone and Francophone Canadians, between Anglophone White South Africans and Boers, and between the indigenous Māori people and European settlers in New Zealand. The term biculturalism was originally adopted in Canada, most notably by the Royal Commission on Bilingualism and Biculturalism (1963–1969), which recommended that Canada become officially bilingual.

Because the term biculturalism suggests, more or less explicitly, that only two cultures merit formal recognition, advocates of multiculturalism (for which biculturalism formed a precedent) may regard bicultural outlooks as inadequately progressive by comparison. This was the case in Canada where Ukrainian Canadians activists such as Jaroslav Rudnyckyj, Paul Yuzyk and other "third force" successfully pressured the Canadian government to adopt multiculturalism as official policy in 1971.

In the context of relations between the cultures of deafness and non-deafness, people find the word "biculturalism" less controversial because the distinction between spoken language and sign language commonly seems like a genuine binary distinction—transcending the distinctions between various spoken languages.

In the context of the United States of America, bicultural distinctions have traditionally existed between the US and Mexico, and between the White and the African-American population of the US.

Regions which formally recognize biculturalism include:

 Belgium, divided basically between speakers of French and of Dutch
 Vanuatu, formerly a condominium with both French and British politico-administrative traditions
 the Polish–Lithuanian Commonwealth, retrospectively termed "The Commonwealth of Both Peoples"
 Switzerland, overwhelmingly German and French in language (though with recognition of Italian and Romansch)
 Paraguay, with a population 90% of which speaks Guaraní and 99% of which speaks Spanish
 New Zealand, where the Treaty of Waitangi forms the basis of a relationship between the Crown and Māori iwi (tribes) through which te reo Māori is recognised as an official language, and Māori have protected representation in Parliament through the Māori electorates
Hong Kong, where both Chinese and English are official languages

Biculturalism can also refer to individuals (see bicultural identity).

See also 
 Bilingualism
 Creolization
 Interracial marriage
 Canadian identity
 Bilingualism in Canada
 Melting pot
 Salad bowl (cultural idea)
 Cultural mosaic
 Plurinationalism
 One-state solution

References

Political terminology in Canada
Multiculturalism
Cultural politics
Majority–minority relations
Interculturalism
Cross-cultural studies
National identity
Sociology of culture